The Regionalliga Nord is the fourth tier of the German football league system in the states of Lower Saxony, Schleswig-Holstein, Bremen and Hamburg. It is one of five leagues at this level, together with the Regionalliga Bayern, Regionalliga Nordost, Regionalliga Südwest and the Regionalliga West. Until the introduction of the 3. Liga in 2008 it was the third tier.

From 1963 to 1974, a Regionalliga Nord existed as the second tier of the German football league system, but it is not related to the current Regionalliga.

Overview 
The Regionalliga Nord was introduced in 1994 along with three other Regionalligas, those being:

Regionalliga Süd
Regionalliga Nordost
Regionalliga West/Südwest

The reason for its introduction was to create a highest regional league for the north of Germany and to allow its champions, and some years the runners-up too, to be directly promoted to the 2nd Bundesliga. Prior to the introduction of the four Regionalligas, the leagues below the second division were the Oberligas, in which there was ten. Those ten Oberliga champions had to go through a promotion play-off rather than being directly promoted. The champions of the Regionalligas Nord and Nordost however had to play-off for a spot in the 2nd Bundesliga from 1996 to 2000. The winner of this contest was promoted, the loser faced the runners-ups of the Regionalligas Süd and West/Südwest for another spot in the second division.

The Regionalliga Nord was direct continuation of the Oberliga Nord, which was disbanded in 1994 in favour of the Regionalliga. Fourteen out of sixteen Oberliga Nord clubs qualified for the new league, only the bottom two teams were relegated to the two new Oberligas.

To replace the Oberliga Nord below the Regionalliga, two new leagues were formed, those being the Oberligas Niedersachsen/Bremen and Hamburg/Schleswig-Holstein. These two leagues were in turn disbanded in 2004 when the Oberliga Nord was reformed.

In 2001, 1. FC Union Berlin of this league became only the second Regionalliga side to reach a German Cup final, losing 2-0 to FC Schalke 04.

With the league changes in Germany in 2008, the Oberliga Nord was again disbanded and the level below the Regionalliga Nord in this region were the five Verbandligas. This required a promotion play-off for this league winners as there were not five promotion spots available for their region. No changes were made in the NOFV region were the two Oberligas Nord and Süd will remain.

The following four teams were promoted to the Regionalliga from 2009:
NOFV-Oberliga Nord champions
NOFV-Oberliga Süd champions
Lower Saxony champions, being the winner of the home-and-away series of the champions of the Oberliga Niedersachsen-West and Oberliga Niedersachsen-Ost
Winner of the promotion play-off for the champions of the Oberliga Hamburg, Bremen and Schleswig-Holstein

League history

Foundation of the Regionalliga Nord

The Regionalliga Nord was formed in 1994 with 18 clubs, fourteen from the Oberliga Nord and one each from the Verbandsligas of Niedersachsen, Bremen, Hamburg and Schleswig-Holstein.

The founding members were:

From the Oberliga Nord:
Kickers Emden
Eintracht Braunschweig
VfL Osnabrück
VfL Herzlake
TuS Hoisdorf
VfB Oldenburg
Holstein Kiel
Werder Bremen II
VfB Lübeck
Hamburger SV II
VfL 93 Hamburg
TuS Celle
1. SC Göttingen 05
SV Lurup

From the Verbandsliga Schleswig-Holstein:
Lüneburger SK

From the Verbandsliga Hamburg:
Concordia Hamburg

From the Verbandsliga Bremen:
FC Bremerhaven

From the Verbandsliga Niedersachsen:
SV Wilhelmshaven

The "new" Regionalliga Nord was actually a reformation of the "old" Regionalliga Nord which operated from 1963 to 1974 in the same region but then as the second tier of German football. Unlike the "old" Regionalliga, the new one allowed reserve teams to compete in it.

Expansion of the league in 2000 

After six seasons, in 2000, the number of Regionalligas was reduced from four to two. Only the Regionalligas Süd and Nord survived. The clubs of the other two were spread according to their geographical location.

Only the teams placed two to six were permitted to remain in the league. The league champion, VfL Osnabrück, was promoted to the 2nd Bundesliga and all clubs from place seven to eighteen were relegated to the Verbandsligas. The league was expanded to nineteen teams and fourteen clubs from the 2nd Bundesliga, Regionalliga West/Südwest and Regionalliga Nordost were admitted.

Remaining in the Regionalliga Nord:
VfB Lübeck
Eintracht Braunschweig
SV Wilhelmshaven
Werder Bremen II
Lüneburger SK

Relegated from the 2nd Bundesliga:
SC Fortuna Köln
Tennis Borussia Berlin

Admitted from the Regionalliga West/Südwest:
Preußen Münster
SC Verl
SG Wattenscheid 09
KFC Uerdingen 05
Rot-Weiß Essen
Fortuna Düsseldorf
Borussia Dortmund II

Admitted from the Regionalliga Nordost:
Union Berlin
Babelsberg 03
Erzgebirge Aue
Dresdner SC
FC Sachsen Leipzig

The league reform in 2008

With the introduction of the 3rd Liga in 2008 and of a third Regionalliga, the Regionalliga West, the league became the fourth tier of German football. The clubs from North Rhine-Westphalia left the league again and joined the new Regionalliga West.

The make up of the leagues was:
Winner and runners-up of the Regionalliga Nord qualified for the 2nd Bundesliga (unless they are reserve teams)
Clubs placed third to tenth went to the new 3rd Liga (only the two best placed reserve teams were admitted)
Clubs placed eleventh to eighteen remained in the Regionalligas (clubs from North Rhine-Westphalia left for the Regionalliga West)
The five best teams from the Oberliga Nord joined the Regionalliga. The sixth placed team played-off with the five Verbandsliga winners from this region for one more place in the Regionalliga.
The three best teams from the NOFV-Oberliga Nord and Süd each and a play-off winner of the two fourth placed teams.

The following 18 teams fulfilled the various qualification criteria and were granted a license for play in the new Regionalliga Nord for the 2008-09 season.

Remaining in the Regionalliga Nord:
1. FC Magdeburg
Hamburger SV II
Babelsberg 03
Energie Cottbus II
VfB Lübeck
VfL Wolfsburg II

From the Oberliga Nord:
Holstein Kiel
SV Wilhelmshaven
FC Altona 93
Hannover 96 II
FC Oberneuland (as play-off winner)

From the NOFV-Oberliga Nord:
Hertha BSC Berlin II
Hansa Rostock II
Türkiyemspor Berlin

From the NOFV-Oberliga Süd: 
Chemnitzer FC
Hallescher FC
VFC Plauen
Sachsen Leipzig (as play-off winner)

The league reform in 2012

In October 2010, another reform of the Regionalligas was decided upon. The number of leagues was now expanded to five, with the Nordost clubs leaving the Regionalliga Nord to form their own Regionalliga Nordost once more. The new system came into operation at the start of the 2012–13 season. It was also decided to limit the number of reserve teams per Regionalliga to seven.

The league reform in 2019
As four teams were relegated from the 3. Liga at the end of the 2018–19 season, the champions of the Regionalliga Nordost, Regionalliga Südwest and Regionalliga West were promoted directly to the 3. Liga and the remaining two champions, VfL Wolfsburg II of the Regionalliga Nord and Bayern Munich II of the Regionalliga Bayern, played a two-legged promotion play-off for the last promotion spot, which was won by Bayern Munich II. In 2020, the three direct promotion spots will go to the champions of the Regionalliga Südwest, Regionalliga Nord and Regionalliga Bayern, while the Nordost and the West champions participate in the play-off. This format was installed initially as a temporary solution until the DFB-Bundestag in September 2019 decided on a format that could have enabled all Regionalliga champions to be promoted. On that date, the Bundestag delegates voted to grant the Südwest and West champions two direct promotions indefinitely starting in 2021. A third direct promotion place will be assigned according to a rotation principle among the Regionalliga Nord, Nordost and Bavarian champions. The representatives from the two remaining Regionalligen will determine the fourth promoted club in two-legged play-offs.

Winners and runners-up of the Regionalliga Nord
The winners and runners-up of the league:

 Promoted teams in bold.

Season abandoned in April 2021 with Weiche Flensburg leading the north division and Werder Bremen II leading the south division. TSV Havelse were nominated for the promotion play-offs.

League statistics
The top goalscorers and attendance figures for the league are:

Placings in the Regionalliga Nord

Current extent of league
Final league positions for clubs from the region currently covered by the league:

Former extent of league
Final league positions for clubs from the regions formerly covered by the league:

Key

Notes
In 2002, 1. FC Magdeburg were refused a licence for the Regionalliga.
In 2001, SV Wilhelmshaven was refused a licence for the Regionalliga.
In 2009, Türkiyemspor Berlin avoided relegation after Kickers Emden withdrew from the 3. Liga.
In 2001, FC Sachsen Leipzig was refused a licence for the Regionalliga.
In 2005, KFC Uerdingen was refused a licence for the Regionalliga.
In 1998, VfL Hamburg 93 withdrew their team from the league.
Tennis Borussia Berlin declared insolvency on 21 May 2010 and was automatically relegated.
Hansa Rostock II withdrew from the league in 2010 for financial reasons.
VfB Lübeck and FC Oberneuland declared insolvency in 2013 and were relegated from the league.
Eintracht Braunschweig II was relegated to the Oberliga in 2018 following the first team's relegation from the 2. Bundesliga, sparing Schwarz-Weiß Rehden from relegation.
In 2021, VfL Wolfsburg II withdrew their team from the league.

References

Sources
 Deutschlands Fußball in Zahlen,  An annual publication with tables and results from the Bundesliga to Verbandsliga/Landesliga. DSFS.
 Kicker Almanach,  The yearbook on German football from Bundesliga to Oberliga, since 1937. Kicker Sports Magazine.
 Die Deutsche Liga-Chronik 1945-2005  History of German football from 1945 to 2005 in tables. DSFS. 2006.

External links 
 Official DFB website on Regionalliga football
 Football results and tables from Germany

Nord
Football competitions in Berlin
Football competitions in Brandenburg
Football competitions in Bremen (state)
Football competitions in Hamburg
Football competitions in Lower Saxony
Football competitions in Mecklenburg-Western Pomerania
Football competitions in Saxony
Football competitions in Saxony-Anhalt
Football competitions in Schleswig-Holstein
Football competitions in Thuringia
1994 establishments in Germany
Sports leagues established in 1994